The Native American name controversy is an ongoing discussion about the changing terminology used by the Indigenous peoples of the Americas to describe themselves, as well as how they prefer to be referred to by others. Preferred terms vary primarily by region and age. As Indigenous peoples and communities are diverse, there is no consensus on naming. Historically, until late in the 20th century, most Indigenous people in the Americas were collectively called "Indians". The distinct people in the Arctic were called "Eskimos".  Both terms have declined in usage in formal speech.    

When discussing broad groups of peoples, naming may be based on shared language, region, or historical relationship, such as "Algonquin-speaking peoples", "Pueblo-dwelling peoples", "Plains Indians", or "LDN peoples" (Lakota, Dakota and Nakota peoples).

Many English exonyms have been used to refer to the Indigenous peoples of the Americas (also known as the New World), who were resident within their own territories when European colonists arrived in the 15th and 16th centuries. Some of these names were based on French, Spanish, or other European language terminology used by earlier explorers and colonists, many of which were derived from the names that tribes called each other; some resulted from the colonists' attempt to translate endonyms from the native language into their own, or to transliterate by sound. In addition, some names or terms were pejorative, arising from prejudice and fear, during periods of conflict (such as the American Indian Wars) between the cultures involved. 

In the 20th and 21st centuries, there has been greater awareness among non-Indigenous peoples that Indigenous peoples in the Americas have been active in discussions of how they wish to be known. Indigenous people have pressed for the elimination of terms they consider to be obsolete, inaccurate, or racist. During the latter half of the 20th century and the rise of the Red Power movement, the United States government responded by proposing the use of the term "Native American" to recognize the primacy of Indigenous peoples' tenure in the country. The term has become widespread nationally but only partially accepted by various Indigenous groups. Other naming conventions have been proposed and used, but none is accepted by all Indigenous groups. Typically, each name has a particular audience and political or cultural connotation, and regional usage varies.

In Canada, the term "First Nations" is generally used for peoples covered by the Indian Act, and "Indigenous peoples" used for native peoples more generally, including Inuit and Métis, who do not fall under the "First Nations" category. Status Indian remains a legal designation because of the Indian Act.

Issues affecting the debate 

 Historical, traditional use of a term (example: "Indian" is a name which many elders have known all their lives, and their families may continue to use the familiar term)
 Rejection of a word perceived as quaint or pejorative (example: "Eskimo")
 Rejection of names used by outsiders and not used by the tribe itself, or Indigenous peoples at large (example: "Nez Perce" is a French phrase; "Native American" was coined by the US government)
 Perception that a name is inherently racist, or has over time acquired racist overtones (example: "Redskin")
 Rejection of names assigned by an occupying and oppressive colonial government or expedition
 Belief that a name is too inclusive or not inclusive enough of all Indigenous peoples, so does not effectively represent the intended group. Examples: "Aboriginal",  more widely associated with Aboriginal Australians, given its wide use on that continent, became a legal designation in section 35 of the Canadian Constitution Act, 1982. The United Nations uses "Indigenous" to refer to all tribal peoples around the world (as their representatives chose to be identified); "Native American" in general use has not applied to Indigenous peoples within Canada or Mexico.
 Reluctance of tribal peoples to be referred to by a collective, racial name, rather than simply by their traditional, individual name for themselves
 Belief that a universal or collective name suggests, inaccurately, that the Indigenous cultures referred to are homogeneous, monolithic bodies, rather than the widely varied separate nations and cultures that they are
 Belief that "Indians" cannot be used to describe global Indigenous cultures when it is already used as the national demonym for citizens from India, a non-Indigenous culture

United States

"Indian" and "American Indian" (since 1492) 

Europeans at the time of Christopher Columbus's voyage often referred to all of South and East Asia as "India" or "the Indias/Indies", sometimes dividing the area into "Greater India", "Middle India", and "Lesser India". The oldest surviving terrestrial globe, by Martin Behaim in 1492 (before Columbus' voyage), labels the entire Asian subcontinent region as "India", named ultimately after the Indus River.

Columbus carried a passport in Latin from the Spanish monarchs that dispatched him ad partes Indie ("toward the regions of India") on their behalf. When he landed in the Antilles, Columbus referred to the resident peoples he encountered there as "Indians", reflecting his purported belief that he had reached the Indian Ocean. The name was adopted by other Spanish and ultimately other Europeans; for centuries the Indigenous peoples of the Americas were collectively called "Indians" in various European languages. This misnomer was perpetuated in place naming; the islands of the Caribbean were named, and are still known as, the West Indies.

As European colonists began to settle in the Americas in the 16th and 17th centuries, and have more sustained contact with the resident peoples, they understood that the residents were not a homogeneous group sharing a unified culture and government, but discrete societies with their own distinct languages and social systems. Early historical accounts show that some colonists, including Jesuit missionaries in New France, attempted to learn and record the autonyms of these individual groups, but the use of the general term "Indian" persisted.

In 1968, the American Indian Movement (AIM) was founded in the United States. In 1977, a delegation from the International Indian Treaty Council, an arm of AIM, elected to collectively identify as "American Indian", at the United Nations Conference on Indians in the Americas in Geneva, Switzerland. Some activists and public figures of Indigenous descent, such as Russell Means, prefer "American Indian" to the more recently adopted "Native American".

Alternative etymology
In the late 20th century, some American public figures suggested that the origin of the term was not from a confusion with India, but from the Spanish expression En Dios, meaning "in God", or a similar one in Italian. Proponents of this idea include comedian George Carlin.

Muscogee writer Bear Heart (Nokus Feke Ematha Tustanaki) wrote in The Wind Is My Mother (1998): "When Columbus found the natives here, they were gentle people who accepted him, so Columbus wrote in his journal, 'These are people of God' (una gente en Dios). Later the 's' was dropped and Indio became Indian." But, David Wilton notes in Word Myths: Debunking Linguistic Urban Legends that this phrase does not appear in any of Columbus' writing. Wilton also says that many European languages since Greek and Roman times used variations of the term "Indian" to describe the peoples of the Indian subcontinent, more than a millennium before the voyages of Columbus.

Objections (since the 1970s) 
Objections to the usage of "Indian" and "American Indian" include the fact that "Indian" arose from a historical error, and does not accurately reflect the origin of the people to whom it refers. In addition, some feel that the term has so absorbed negative and demeaning connotations through its historical usage as to render it objectionable in context. Additionally, "American Indian" is often understood to mean only the peoples of the mainland body of the United States, which excludes other peoples considered Indigenous peoples of the Americas; including the Haida, Tlingit, Athabascan, Inuit, Yup'ik (Yuits/Alutiiq/Cup'ik), Iñupiat, Aleut (i.e., the groups whose traditional languages are Eskimo–Aleut languages), Marshallese, and Samoan. Related groups among these tribal peoples are referred to collectively as either Alaskan Natives (based on geography), First Nations (in Canada), Native Hawaiians, or Siberians.

Supporters of the terms "Indian" and "American Indian" argue that they have been in use for such a long period of time that many people have become accustomed to them and no longer consider them exonyms. Both terms are still widely used today. "American Indian" appears often in treaties between the United States and the Indigenous peoples with whom they have been negotiating since the colonial period, and many federal, state and local laws also use it. "American Indian" is the term used in the United States Census.

"Native American" (since the 1960s) 
The Oxford English Dictionary cites usage of the uncapitalized term native American in several publications dating to 1737, but it is unclear whether these texts refer to Indigenous peoples, or simply to persons born on American soil. One early use is the 1817 novel Keep Cool by John Neal, which declares "the Indian is the only native American; he holds his charter from God himself".  During the 1850s, a group of Anglo-Saxon Protestant Americans used the capitalized term Native Americans to differentiate themselves from recent Irish and German immigrants, both of which groups were predominantly Catholic. The group later formed the "Know-Nothings", a 19th-century political party that opposed immigration to the United States, a policy known as nativism. The Know-Nothings also called themselves the "Native American Party" and were referred to in the press with the capitalized term.

In 1918, leaders of the Indigenous Peyote Religion incorporated as the Native American Church of Oklahoma. In 1956, British writer Aldous Huxley wrote to thank a correspondent for "your most interesting letter about the Native American churchmen".

The use of Native American or native American to refer to Indigenous peoples who live in the Americas came into widespread, common use during the civil rights era of the 1960s and 1970s. This term was considered to represent historical fact more accurately (i.e., "Native" cultures predated European colonization). In addition, activists also believed it was free of negative historical connotations that had come to be associated with previous terms.

Between 1982 and 1993, most American manuals of style came to agree that "color terms" referring to ethnic groups, such as Black, should be capitalized as proper names, as well as Native American.

Other objections to Native American—whether capitalized or not—include a concern that it is often understood to exclude American groups outside the contiguous US (e.g., Alaska, Hawaii, and Puerto Rico), and Indigenous groups in South America, Mexico and Canada. The word American is sometimes questioned because the peoples referred to resided in the Americas before they were so named.

As of 1995, according to the US Census Bureau, 50% of people who identified as Indigenous preferred the term American Indian, 37% preferred Native American, and the remainder preferred other terms or had no preference.

"Indigenous" (1980s) 
According to The American Heritage Dictionary, "Indigenous specifies that something or someone is native rather than coming or being brought in from elsewhere: an indigenous crop; the Ainu, a people indigenous to the northernmost islands of Japan."

The United Nations World Summit on Sustainable Development used the term "Indigenous peoples" for the first time in its official political declaration in 2002. Prior to this date, the term was considered to be "still under debate" for usage in official UN documents.

"Aboriginal" and "Aborigine" 
The English adjective "aboriginal" and the noun "aborigine" come from a Latin phrase meaning "from the origin;" the ancient Romans used it to refer to a contemporary group, one of many ancient peoples in Italy. Until about 1910, these terms were used in English to refer to various Indigenous peoples. Today throughout most of the English-speaking world, it is most commonly understood to refer to the Indigenous Australians, with the notable exception of Canada, where the term "aboriginal" (but not aborigine) came into use in the Canadian Constitution Act, 1982.

"Alaska Native" 
"Alaska Native" refers to the Indigenous peoples in Alaska, including the Aleut, Athabascan, Alutiiq, Cup'ik, Haida, Inuit, Iñupiat, Tlingit and Yup'ik peoples. The term predominates because of its legal use in the Alaska Native Claims Settlement Act, and includes all the above-named peoples, who are from different cultures and language families.

"Eskimo" 

The term Eskimo was once common, but it is now perceived as derogatory and is being replaced in common use with "Inuit" or individual groups' own names for themselves.

In addition to being a name imposed from outside rather than an Inuit term, one reason that Eskimo is considered derogatory is the widespread, but incorrect, perception that in Algonkian languages, spoken by some competitive historic tribes of present-day Canada and US, it means "eaters of raw meat".

"Inuit" (since 1977) 

The Inuit Circumpolar Conference meeting in Barrow, Alaska (now Utqiaġvik) in 1977 officially adopted "Inuit" as a designation for the circumpolar Indigenous groups of the USA, Canada, Greenland, and Russia.

"Amerind" or "Amerindian"
The term "Amerind"/"Amerindian" is a portmanteau of "American Indian". It was coined in 1902 by the American Anthropological Association, but from its creation has been controversial. It was immediately rejected by some leading members of the Association, and while adopted by many it was never universally accepted.  Usage in English occurs primarily in anthropological and linguistic contexts, rather than Native American ones; it also finds some use in news outlets in describing the Taíno People of Puerto Rico. The term "Amerind" has official status in Guyana.

Canada

"Canadian Indians" (1700s–late 20th century) 
The Canadian Indian Act, first passed in 1876, in defining the rights of people of recognized First Nations, refers to them as "Indians". The responsible federal government department was the Department of Indian Affairs and Northern Development, now Indigenous and Northern Affairs Canada, headed by the Minister of Indigenous and Northern Affairs. The Act officially recognizes people commonly known as "Status Indians", although "Registered Indian" is the official term for those on the Indian Register. Lands set aside for the use of First Nations are officially known as Indian reserves (abbreviated IR on maps, etc.). The word "band" is used in band government. Some First Nations communities also use "Indian Band" in their official names.

"Aboriginal peoples" (since 1900) and "Indigenous peoples" 
In Canada, the term "Aboriginal peoples in Canada" is used for all Indigenous peoples within the country, including the Inuit and First Nations, as well as the Métis. More recently, the term Indigenous peoples has been used more frequently and in 2015 the federal government department responsible for First Nations, Metis, and Inuit issues changed its name from Aboriginal Affairs and Northern Development Canada to Indigenous and Northern Affairs Canada.

"First Nations" (since the 1980s) 

"First Nations" came into common usage in the 1980s to replace the term "Indian band". Elder Sol Sanderson says that he coined the term in the early 1980s. Others state that the term came into common usage in the 1970s to avoid using the word “Indian”, which some people considered offensive. Apparently, no legal definition of the term exists. However, the Assembly of First Nations, the national advocacy group for First Nations peoples, adopted the term in 1985.  The singular commonly used is "First Nations person" (when gender-specific, "First Nations man" or "First Nations woman").

"First Peoples" 
"First Peoples" is a broad term that includes First Nations, Inuit, and Métis. Owing to its similarity to the term "First Nations", the two terms are sometimes used interchangeably.

"Native Canadians" 
"Native" or "Native Canadian" is an ambiguous term, but people frequently use it in conversation or informal writing. A majority use this term for describing Indigenous peoples, including some Indigenous people themselves. This is considered to be quite offensive as Indigenous peoples living in Canada existed prior to colonization and some do not view themselves as Canadians.

Canadian French nomenclature 
In Canadian French, the terms are première(s) nation(s) for "First Nations" and autochtone for "Aboriginal" (used both as a noun and adjective).

The term indien or indienne has historically been used in the legislation, notably in the Loi sur les Indiens (The Indian Act), but it is unacceptable outside of this specific context. First Nations in Québec have also called for the term amérindien to be discontinued, in favour of autochtone. The word amérindien contains the word indien (Indian) and since they are not Indians, the word is no longer favored and it has, for example, been removed from some elementary school textbooks.  The term indigène is not used as it is seen as having negative connotations because of its similarity to the French indigent ("poor"). It has also acquired further negative associations in French, owing to the indigénat code enforced in French colonial Africa, 1887–1947. The old French term  ("wild, savage") is no longer used either, as it is considered racist.

"Inuit" (since 1977) 

The people of the Canadian Arctic are currently officially known as the Inuit, which means 'the people', or singularly, Inuk, which means 'the person,' as a result of the 1977 Inuit Circumpolar Conference. Canada's Constitution Act, 1982, uses "Inuit," as does the Inuit Tapiriit Kanatami, the national organization that represents the Inuit in Canada. The preferred term in Canada's Central Arctic is Inuinnaq, and in the eastern Canadian Arctic Inuit. The language is often called Inuktitut, though other local designations are also used.

Regional

"Anishinaabe" 
The Algonquin autonym Anishinaabe (also Anishinabe, Anicinape) is used as a cross-tribal term in Algonquian-majority areas, such as Anishnabe Health, Anishnabe Education, and Training Circle. The term is also used among historically Anishinaabe peoples in the Upper Midwest region of the United States.

Chinook Jargon nomenclature 
The Chinook Jargon, the old trade language of the Pacific Northwest, uses siwash (an adaptation of the French ) for "Indian", "Native American", or "First Nations", either as adjective or noun. While normally meaning a male native, it is used in certain combinations, such as siwash cosho ("a seal", literally "Indian pig" or "Indian pork").

Many native communities perceive the terms  and siwash negatively, but others use it freely. They consider use by non-natives to be derogatory. In the creolized form of Chinook Jargon spoken at the Grand Ronde Agency in Oregon, a distinction is made between siwash and sawash. The accent in the latter is on the second syllable, resembling the French original, and is used in Grand Ronde Jargon meaning "anything native or Indian"; by contrast, they consider siwash to be defamatory.

The Chinook Jargon term for a native woman is klootchman, an originally Nootka word adopted in regional English to mean a native woman or, as in the Jargon, all women and also anything female. It originated as a compound of Nootka łūts 'female' with the English suffix -man. Hyas klootchman tyee means "queen", klootchman cosho, "sow"; and klootchman tenas or tenas klootchman means "girl" or "little girl". Generally klootchman in regional English simply means a native woman and has not acquired the derisive sense of siwash or squaw. The short form klootch—encountered only in English-Chinook hybrid phrasings—is always derisive, especially in forms such as blue-eyed klootch.

Latin America 

In Mexico, the preferred expression used by both the Government and the media is "Indigenous peoples" ( in Spanish).

In Mexico, Brazil, and several other countries, these names are normally applied only to the ethnic groups that have maintained their identity and, to some extent, their original way of life.

In most of Latin America there are also large segments of the population with mixed Indigenous and non-Indigenous ancestry, who are largely integrated into mainstream society, and by and large no longer identify themselves with their Indigenous ancestral groups unless they coexist with their ancestral Indigenous nation.

In some Spanish-speaking countries, there are also Ladinos who do not have significant European ancestry, but have adopted the culture of the dominant non-Indigenous population. In Brazil, however, assimilated Indigenous people are called  (itself a subset of pardos, or brown people), the same term used for people of European and Amerindian ancestry who do not have at the same time a white-passing phenotype and a mainstream Brazilian cultural identity – which also means that  are not necessarily  (Portuguese for "mixed-race" in general).

International

"Indigenous peoples" 
During the late 20th century the term "Indigenous peoples" evolved into a political term that refers to ethnic groups with historical ties to groups that existed in a territory prior to colonization or formation of a nation state. The "I" is always capitalized as it is in references to a group of people. In the Americas, the term "Indigenous peoples of the Americas" was adopted, and the term is tailored to specific geographic or political regions, such as "Indigenous peoples of Panama". "'Indigenous peoples' ... is a term that internationalizes the experiences, the issues and the struggles of some of the world's colonized peoples", writes Māori educator Linda Tuhiwai Smith. "The final 's' in 'Indigenous peoples' ... [is] a way of recognizing that there are real differences between different Indigenous peoples."

Turtle Islander
Another, less commonly used term is in reference to the continent: Turtle Island. Though officially named North America, a number of histories from various Turtle Island countries make reference to the continent existing atop a turtle's back. Though not present across all nations and countries, this symbolism and icon has spread to become nearly pan-Indigenous. As Europeans, Asians and Africans have terms that allude to their home continents, "Turtle Islander" is an attempt to do just that.

Controversial terminology

Indian princess 

In most situations, such as among non-Natives, the term "Indian princess" is considered demeaning to Native American women. Native Americans have never had a European concept of royalty, so the title of "princess" is not a part of any traditional Native culture. Non-Natives dressing up in costumes that are supposed to resemble Native American regalia, such as in a Halloween "Indian Princess" costume, or in other ways playing Indian, is generally considered offensive, racist, and a form of cultural appropriation. 

Among some Native Americans, there is also an in-group usage among some powwow organizations, colleges, and other Indigenous groups who hold pageants and scholarship competitions, who may use the term "Princess" as a component in the titles they award. Generally, these events are for recognizing cultural skills and community leadership. However, there are also calls from participants to stop using the term "Princess" for these titles, due to the negative stereotypes and the discomfort the nomenclature can cause when interacting with non-Natives, and to replace the term with "more culturally relevant and accurate nomenclature."

Injun
"Injun" is an originally 17th century mispronunciation of "Indian", generally considered offensive today, used to mock or impersonate Native Americans' or early settlers' supposed heavily accented English (e.g., "Honest Injun", "Injun time"). The word and related terms have been defined as derogatory by Indigenous peoples and are not widely used.

Redskin / Red Indian

Both Americans and Europeans have historically called Native Americans "Red Indians". The term was largely used in the 18th to 20th centuries, partially based on the color metaphors for race which colonists and settlers historically used in North America and Europe, and also to distinguish Native Americans from the Indian people of India.

The term "Red Indians" was also more specifically used by Europeans to refer to the Beothuk, a people living on Newfoundland who used red ochre in spring to paint not only their bodies, but also their houses, canoes, weapons, household appliances and musical instruments.

The term "Redskins" is now generally seen, by Native Americans in particular, as pejorative and often highly offensive, as it is the term that was used for body parts used as "proof of kill" when Native Americans were hunted for bounty by colonists on the frontier. There was an American National Football League team named the Washington Redskins until 2020, and "Redskin" is the name of the mascot at the Red Mesa High School on the Navajo Reservation in Teec Nos Pos, Arizona. Native Americans have been protesting against the use of these names by non-Natives since the 1970s.

The National Congress of American Indians (NCAI) maintains that names like Redskins perpetuate negative stereotypes of Native Americans, "Often citing a long held myth by non-Native people that 'Indian' mascots 'honor Native people', American sports businesses such as the NFL's Washington 'Redskins'... continue to profit from harmful stereotypes originated during a time when white superiority and segregation were commonplace."

Savage

Anthropologists once used savage as a blanket term to refer to Indigenous peoples worldwide (for example, Bronisław Malinowski titled his 1929 study The Sexual Life of Savages in North-Western Melanesia). At the beginning of the nineteenth century, representatives of the relatively new United States government often used the term in official records when referring to Indian nations (e.g., Justice Baldwin's concurring opinion in Cherokee Nation v. Georgia). This was related to their association of non-Christian people as savages. Early anthropologist Lewis H. Morgan posited in Ancient Society (1877) a three-part evolution of societies from, in his terms, savagery through barbarism to civilization.
European Christians once broadly used the word "heathens" to refer to Native Americans, a pejorative Christian term that refers to people who do not worship the Christian god.

Squaw

The English word "squaw", when used to refer to Indigenous women, is considered highly offensive, derogatory, misogynist and racist. Although there has been some controversy on the topic, it is almost always grouped with other words that carry a colonial implication of exotic inferiority based on race, such as "negress". There is a movement to remove the name "squaw" from geographic place names across the United States. There is a minority counter-movement among a small number of academics to "reclaim" what they claim is the possible original meaning of the word, as an in-group term, which could still be offensive if used outside of that speech community. But even this usage would only be relevant to the original, Algonquian-language phonemes of the word — the small parts that make up larger, historical forms — not the English form currently used as a slur. Any effort at "reclamation" would not apply to the much larger Native American community of women who are affected by this slur, as Algonquian-speakers make up only a small minority of those affected by it.

See also 
 Abya Yala, a proposed native name (from the Kuna language) for the Americas, avoiding the mention of Amerigo Vespucci or Richard Amerike
 
 Lamanites

Notes

References 

 
 Includes sources (including quotes: Russel Means at "I am an American Indian, Not a Native American!" and Christina Berry at "What's in a Name? Indians and Political Correctness", also referenced on this page).
 
 
 Dailey referenced "Puget Sound Geography" by T. T. Waterman. Washington DC: National Anthropological Archives, mss. [n.d.] [ref. 2];
 Duwamish et al. vs. United States of America, F-275. Washington DC: US Court of Claims, 1927. [ref. 5];
 "Indian Lake Washington" by David Buerge in the Seattle Weekly, 1–7 August 1984 [ref. 8];
 "Seattle Before Seattle" by David Buerge in the Seattle Weekly, 17–23 December 1980. [ref. 9];
 The Puyallup-Nisqually by Marian W. Smith. New York: Columbia University Press, 1940. [ref. 10].
 Recommended start is "Coast Salish Villages of Puget Sound".
 
  
 Dyck, Michael (ed.) (16 June 2002). ibiblio – Open and Free Resources, the GNU version of The Collaborative International Dictionary of English, presented in the Extensible Markup Language. Based on GCIDE version 0.46 (15 April 2002). Retrieved 21 April 2006.

External links 
 Aboriginal Identity & Terminology by Dr. Linc Kesler (2009) First Nations Studies Program at the University of British Columbia
 'Indian' or 'Native American'? [Reservations, Part 0], 2019 video by CGP Grey

Indigenous peoples of the Americas
Indigenous peoples of North America
Native American topics
First Nations culture
Naming controversies
Native American-related controversies